Seaview or Sea View may refer to:

Places
 Clifton Beach, Karachi, also known as Sea View, a beach in Pakistan
 Sea View, Dorset, a suburb in England
 Seaview, Isle of Wight, a small village in England
 Seaview, Lower Hutt, an industrial suburb of Lower Hutt, New Zealand
 Seaview, New Brunswick, a small Canadian coastal community
 Seaview, Eastern Cape, South Africa
 Seaview, Hawaii, United States
 Seaview, Virginia, United States
 Seaview, Washington, United States
 Seaview, Seattle, Washington, United States

Television and film 
 USOS Seaview or S.S.R.N. Seaview, the fictitious submarine from Voyage to the Bottom of the Sea (USOS in the film, S.S.R.N. in the television series)
 Seaview (TV series), a British children's TV series from the 1980s
 Seaview (film), a 2008 Irish documentary film

Other uses
 The Catlin Seaview Survey
 Seaview (football ground), football stadium in north Belfast, Northern Ireland, home of Crusaders F.C.
 Seaview (Galloway, New Jersey), a golf club in Absecon, New Jersey, United States
 Seaview (novel), by Toby Olson
 Seaview SVII, an underwater camera
 Seaview Asylum, in Hokitika, New Zealand
 Seaview Hospital, in Staten Island, New York, United States
 Seaview Terrace, a mansion in Newport, Rhode Island, United States
 Sea View Yacht Club, Isle of Wight, England